SVL may refer to:

 SVL, IATA code for Savonlinna Airport
Scientific Vector Language
Lobaev Sniper Rifle, (Snaj'perskaj'a Vintovka Lobaj'eva in Russian)
 SVL, an experimental turbojet train
Union of Clothing Workers, a former trade union in Finland
Snout–vent length, a measurement in herpetology.
Saginaw Valley League, a high school athletics conference in Michigan
Sport Vereniging Langbroek, a multi-sports club in Langbroek, Netherlands.